"Liechtensteiner Polka" is a song written by Edmund Kötscher and Rudi Lindt and performed by Will Glahé and His Orchestra. It reached #16 on the U.S. pop chart in 1957.

Other charting versions
Lawrence Welk and His Orchestra released a version of the song which reached #62 on the U.S. pop chart in 1957.

Other versions
The Big Ben Banjo Band released a version of the song sung in English as a single in the UK in 1957, but it did not chart.
Li'l Wally released a version of the song as a single in 1957, but it did not chart.
Horst Wende and His Polka Boys released a version of the song as a single in 1957, but it did not chart.
Frankie Yankovic and His Yanks released a version of the song on their 1959 EP The All-Time Great Polkas Vol. 3.
Bob Kames released a version of the song as the B-side to his 1960 single "Lili Marlene".
The Pogues incorporated the piece in their song "Fiesta" on their 1988 album If I Should Fall From Grace With God.
101 Strings released a version of the song on their 1990 album Polka.
The Mom and Dads released a version of the song on their 1995 album Love Is a Beautiful Song.
Jimmy Sturr released a version of the song on the 1998 various artist album Legends of Polka.
"Weird Al" Yankovic incorporated the song in his Polka Face medley.

References

1957 songs
1957 singles
London Records singles
Coral Records singles
Columbia Records singles
Decca Records singles